Kokomo Records was an American independent record label, founded in the 1960s by Ted Griffiths and Trevor Huyton.

It reissued pre-war blues recordings by musicians such as Texas Alexander, Kokomo Arnold,  Barbecue Bob, Doctor Clayton, Robert Johnson, Blind Willie McTell, Buddy Moss and Tampa Red.

See also
 List of record labels

External links
 Illustrated Kokomo Records discography

Blues record labels
Defunct record labels of the United States
Reissue record labels